{{Taxobox
| name = Rhenonema
| fossil_range = Givetian
| image = Rhenonema eifeliense.jpg 
| image_caption = R. eifeliense
| regnum = Animalia
| phylum = Chordata
| subphylum = Vertebrata
| classis = Placodermi
| ordo = Arthrodira
| familia = Holonematidae
| genus = Rhenonema
| genus_authority = Obruchev, 1964
| species = R. eifeliense
| species_authority = (Kayser, 1880)
| binomial = Rhenonema eifeliense
| binomial_authority = (Kayser, 1880)
| synonyms =
 Dinichthys eifeliense Kayser, 1880<ref name=Denison1>{{cite book|last=Denison|first=Robert|title=Placodermi Volume 2 of Handbook of Paleoichthyology|year=1978|publisher=Gustav Fischer Verlag|location=Stuttgart New York|isbn=978-0-89574-027-4|pages=87}}</ref>

}}Rhenonema eifeliense''' ("Rheinland thread of Eifel") is a large, extinct, high-crested holonematid arthrodire placoderm from Givetian-aged strata of Middle Devonian Gerolstein, Germany. The ornamentation is very similar to that of Holonema, but the concentrically arranged ridges are much coarser in Rhenonema. The holotype was originally described by Kayser, in 1880, as a species of Dinichthys'', but was then redescribed in 1964 by Obruchev as a holonematid.

References

Holonematidae
Placoderms of Europe